Wilderspin is an English surname. Notable people with the surname include:

 Clive Wilderspin (1930–2021), Australian tennis player
 Samuel Wilderspin (1792–1866), English educator

English-language surnames